Darius Kilgo (born December 14, 1991) is an American football defensive tackle who is a free agent. He played college football at Maryland.

Professional career

Denver Broncos
Kilgo was drafted in the sixth round (203rd overall) by the Denver Broncos in the 2015 NFL Draft. During his rookie campaign in 2015, Kilgo appeared in nine games making six tackles and a pass defended. He was a part of the Broncos #1 defense in the NFL during the 2015 season. In the 2015 season, Kilgo and the Broncos made Super Bowl 50. Kilgo was inactive for the game. On February 7, 2016, the Broncos defeated the Carolina Panthers by a score of 24–10.
On November 25, 2016, Kilgo was released by the Broncos.

New England Patriots
Kilgo was claimed off waivers by the Patriots on November 28, 2016. He was released by the Patriots on December 8, 2016 and was re-signed to the practice squad. He remained on the practice squad for the remainder of the season. Kilgo's Patriots won Super Bowl LI by a score of 34–28 over the Atlanta Falcons.

On February 7, 2017, Kilgo signed a futures contract with the Patriots. On September 2, 2017, he was waived by the Patriots and signed to the practice squad the next day, only to be released the following day.

Jacksonville Jaguars
On September 8, 2017, Kilgo was signed to the Jacksonville Jaguars' practice squad.

Houston Texans
On January 30, 2018, Kilgo signed a reserve/future contract with the Houston Texans. He was waived on September 1, 2018 and was signed to the practice squad the next day. He was released on September 11, 2018.

Tennessee Titans
On September 18, 2018, Kilgo was signed to the Tennessee Titans' practice squad. He was promoted to the active roster on September 28, 2018.

On April 29, 2019, Kilgo was waived by the Titans.

Detroit Lions
On May 2, 2019, Kilgo was signed by the Detroit Lions. He was placed on injured reserve on August 10, 2019.

New England Patriots (second stint)
Kilgo signed with the New England Patriots on August 11, 2020. He was released on August 22, 2020.

Denver Broncos (second stint)
On October 3, 2020, Kilgo was signed to the Denver Broncos practice squad. He was placed on the practice squad/COVID-19 list by the team on December 3, 2020, and restored to the practice squad on December 16. His practice squad contract with the team expired after the season on January 11, 2021.

Arizona Cardinals
On August 9, 2021, Kilgo signed with the Arizona Cardinals. He was waived on August 16.

References

External links 
 
 Maryland Terrapins bio

1991 births
Living people
Players of American football from North Carolina
People from Matthews, North Carolina
American football defensive linemen
Maryland Terrapins football players
Denver Broncos players
New England Patriots players
Jacksonville Jaguars players
Houston Texans players
Tennessee Titans players
Detroit Lions players
Arizona Cardinals players